Piz Martegnas is a mountain of the Oberhalbstein Alps, overlooking Savognin in Graubünden, Switzerland. Piz Martegnas is part of a ski area, a chair lift station lies 11 metres below the summit.

See also
List of mountains of Switzerland accessible by public transport

References

External links

 Piz Martegnas on Hikr

Mountains of Switzerland
Mountains of Graubünden
Mountains of the Alps
Two-thousanders of Switzerland
Surses